Around 40,000 Rohingya refugees live in slums and camps across India, including Jammu, Hyderabad, Nuh, and Delhi, the majority of whom are undocumented. 5,000 Rohingyas sought refuge in Jammu after the 2017 military crackdown against Rohingya Muslims.

Jammu detentions
Following a military crackdown of the Rohingyas' homeland in 2017, approximately 5,000 Rohingyas sought refuge in Jammu. In 2021, authorities in Jammu detained more than 160 refugees, with the purpose of deporting them to Myanmar. Families of these refugees have raised concerns about the perilous conditions in Myanmar, particularly following the 2021 Myanmar coup d'état.

After the Bharatiya Janata Party came to power in 2014, anti-Rohingya sentiment grew in India, with its leaders urging the removal of Rohingyas from the country. The United Nations High Commissioner for Refugees (UNHCR) in India issues identity cards to registered refugees intended to protect them from arbitrary arrests and deportations. In India, however, the UNHCR identity cards do not offer protection from detention. They only serve to provide access to services. At best, they protect from punitive action.

Leaders of the BJP have initiated campaigns calling for the expulsion of all Rohingya.

See also
Rohingya refugees in Nepal
Rohingya refugees in Bangladesh

References

Refugees in India
Rohingya people